"Galvanized Yankee" was an American television movie broadcast on December 9, 1957, as part of the second season of the CBS television series Playhouse 90. Russell S. Hughes wrote the teleplay as an adaptation of Gordon D. Shireff's novel Massacre Creek. Paul Wendkos directed, Winston O'Keefe was the producer, and George Diskant was the director of photography. Lloyd Nolan, James Whitmore, and Victor Jory starred.

Plot
During the American Civil War, the commander of a Northern prisoner of war camp orders the execution of a Confederate soldier. The brother of executed soldier then seeks revenge on the commander.

Cast
The following performers received screen credit for their performances:

 Lloyd Nolan - Capt. Kuyper
 James Whitmore - Capt. Miles Shay
 Victor Jory - Capt. Hume
 Neville Brand - Sgt. Duggan
 Chuck Courtney - Bob Shay
 Martha Vickers
 William Boyette

References

1957 television plays
1957 American television episodes
Playhouse 90 (season 2) episodes